N. spinosa may refer to:
 Nangura spinosa, a skink species in the genus Nangura
 Naraoia spinosa, a trilobite species
 Neocteniza spinosa, a spider species in the genus Neocteniza
 Nepenthes spinosa, a tropical pitcher plant species
 Nephroselmis spinosa, an alga species in the genus Nephroselmis
 Nezumia spinosa, a fish species in the genus Nezumia

See also
 Spinosa (disambiguation)